Hüseyin Tavur (born December 15, 1972) is a Turkish football manager. He is the head coach of the Izmir-based Altay S.K. U17 since the 2015–16 season, which competes in the Turkish Regional Youth Development Under −17 Football League.

Hüseyin Tavur was born in Nevşehir, Turkey on December 15, 1972. He is married with Aysun Güzen Tavur.

He was appointed technical director of the women's football team at Konak Belediyespor in 2006. He was instrumental for the success of his team. He brought the team in the 2009–10 Women's League season to the third place, and the next season to the runner-up. He led then the women from Izmir to the league champion title in the 2012–13 season. Konak Belediyespor finished the 2013–14 season again champion, this time unbeaten. He won the 2014–15 league championship with Konak Belediyespor for the third consecutive time after finishing the season undefeated and beating Ataşehir Belediyespor in the play-off game.

His team took part at the 2013–14 UEFA Women's Champions League, and advanced to the Round of 16 as the first ever Turkish club.

For the 2015–16 season, he moved to Altay S.K. to manage their under-17 team in the Turkish Regional Youth Development Under −17 Football League (BGGL U17).

Managerial statistics

Honours
Konak Belediyespor
Turkish Women's First Football League
 Winners (3): 2012–13, 2013–14, 2014–15
 Runners-up (1): 2010–11
 Third place (1): 2009–10

References

External links
Konak Belediyespor official website

1972 births
Sportspeople from Nevşehir
Turkish football managers
Turkish women's football managers
Living people
Konak Belediyespor